The Danish Football Union (DBU) is the governing body of football in Denmark. It is the organization of the Danish football clubs and runs the professional Danish football leagues and the men's and women's national teams. It is based in the city of Brøndby and is a founding member of both FIFA and UEFA. The DBU has also been the governing body of futsal in Denmark since 2008.

Beginnings
The DBU was founded on 18 May 1889 and was the first national football association outside Great Britain and Ireland. However, it did not register games officially before the 1908 Summer Olympics, meaning that the win in the 1906 Intercalated Olympics tournament was not officially recorded by the DBU.

DBU competitions

Men's 
Leagues
Superliga
First Division
Second Divisions 
Third Divisions 
Denmark Series (4 groups)
Cups
DBU Pokalen

Women's 
Elite Division
First Division
Danish Series (3 groups)
Cup

Defunct 
 Landsfodboldturneringen (1913–1927)
 Provinsmesterskabsturneringen (1913–1931)
 Sylow-Tournament (1918–1926)

Regional structure

The DBU is separated into six regional associations, based on the former counties of Denmark:
 DBU Jutland, which in turn is separated into four regions:
 Region 1: Nordjylland County
 Region 2: Viborg and Ringkøbing counties
 Region 3: Århus and Vejle counties
 Region 4: Ribe and South Jutland counties
 DBU Funen: Funen County
 DBU Zealand: West Zealand, Roskilde, Frederiksborg, Copenhagen counties and Zealand part of Storstrøm County
 DBU Copenhagen: Frederiksberg and Copenhagen municipalities
 DBU Lolland-Falster: Non-Zealand part of Storstrøm County
 DBU Bornholm: Bornholm municipality

The Faroe Islands and Greenland, which are autonomous territories within Denmark, have their own football associations and are not part of the DBU. Greenland is not a member of FIFA or any continental federation, but the Faroe Islands are a member of both FIFA and UEFA.

International teams
The Denmark national football teams represents Denmark in international football competitions and is controlled by the DBU. , the teams consist of:

Women's 
A-level National Team
Under-23 National Team
Under-19 National Team
Under-17 National Team
Under-16 National Team

Men's 
A-level National Team
Under-21 National Team
Under-20 National Team
Under-19 National Team
Under-18 National Team
Under-17 National Team
Under-16 National Team
Futsal National Team
Oldboys National Team

Yearly honours

The DBU awards the best national team players each year, with an award to the best senior team player, as well as the best player in three of the DBU's six national youth teams.

Player of the Year
Since 1963, the DBU has awarded the Danish Player of the Year in a vote amongst the Danish players. In the time of amateur football, only players in the domestic league could achieve the prize, and even after the emergence of paid football in 1978, no players in foreign clubs were eligible for the award. When the award was finally opened to all Danish players, domestic and abroad, in 1983, national team captain Morten Olsen was the first player to win the Player of the Year award taking all Danish players into consideration. The record number of award wins is four, by Brian Laudrup (1989, 1992, 1995, and 1997).

Young Players of the Year
DBU found new sponsor DONG (later DONG Energy), an oil company, in 2004 but Arla went on to sponsor the prize which was renamed  (the Arla Talent Awards) in 2005.

National team contract negotiations

Women's national team

In 2017, the negotiations regarding terms and salary with the women's national team broke down, causing DBU to cancel the world cup qualification match against Sweden.
The team lost the match 3–0 due to forfeit. DBU was handed a fine by the UEFA disciplinary committee. The national team and DBU came to an agreement before the match was supposed to be played, but the match was already cancelled.
The team then failed to qualify directly to the world cup. A playoff match will decide if the team will qualify to the world cup.

Men's national team
After the 2018 FIFA World Cup, the agreement between DBU and the men's national team expired.
The negotiations about terms and salary are still ongoing. Currently DBU has selected a squad without any players from the top tier of international and national leagues.
The team is to play two matches. DBU refuses to negotiate before the end of the two matches.

The badge is still in use on the Danish men's kit for the European Championship 2020 (so-named despite being played in 2021 due to the COVID-19 pandemic).

References

External links

  
 Denmark at FIFA site
 Denmark at UEFA site

Denmark
Football governing bodies in Denmark
Futsal in Denmark
Football
1889 establishments in Denmark
Sports organizations established in 1889